Elijah Quashie (born May 28th, 1993 in Enfield, London), also known as The Chicken Connoisseur or The CNSR (screen name), is an internet celebrity and fried chicken restaurant critic, known for his viral YouTube video series The Pengest Munch.

Career
Quashie started his YouTube channel The Pengest Munch in August 2015, inspired by Gregg Wallace of television series MasterChef, produced by film maker Elishama Udorok. Until December 2016, Quashie's videos had around 700 views each, with a total of 150 subscribers. The videos involve Quashie visiting, critiquing and rating chicken shops around London.

The Pengest Munch went viral on 9 December, with coverage from The Huffington Post, The Daily Telegraph and BuzzFeed and support from John Boyega and Graham Linehan. Metro cited "stunning insight, humour and style" as the reasons behind his success. Another focus of the coverage has been the use of slang in the videos; The Huffington Post has been criticised for suggesting that in these videos "the slang of working class black kids is beyond normal comprehension". He appeared on ITV London on 13 December, and released a new episode to YouTube on 16 December.

In December 2016, he established Chicken Connoisseur Ltd and in April 2017 it was announced that he would be writing a book entitled The Pengest Munch: In Search of the Nation's 50 Favourite Chicken Establishments, published by Blink Publishing.

It was announced in October 2017 that Quashie would star in a new Channel 4 television show entitled The Peng Life. The programme started in August 2018 and featured four episodes.

In January 2021, Quashie renamed his channel to The CNSR.

Controversy
In January 2017, Quashie came under criticism after he featured Taylor Harris (stage name 'Bonkaz') rapping in one of his YouTube videos. Harris was previously convicted of groping a 13-year-old girl in 2010. Harris was also jailed for three years in 2011 for his part in a kidnapping and torture of a 22-year-old disabled man.

Personal life
Quashie lives in Tottenham in North London. Following his rise to fame, many people speculated about his age due to his youthful appearance.  Quashie confirmed his age as 23 (as of December 2016) in a tweet he swiftly deleted. This is corroborated by a number of government records stating his date of birth as May 1993. Quashie has also said that he is not interested in discussing his age. Quashie is also an Arsenal fan, stating it in his YouTube videos and interviews since his rise to prominence. Quashie is also a member of the Church of Jesus Christ of Latter-day Saints.

In May 2017, Quashie endorsed Labour Party leader Jeremy Corbyn in the 2017 UK general election. During an interview with The Fader he said: "he's one of the few people who make sense".

References

1993 births
Living people
British Internet celebrities
British restaurant critics
People from Enfield, London
Black British people
English people of Jamaican descent
English Latter Day Saints